Sergey Shtikhlits (born 20 June 1981), best known as Robert Stieglitz, is a German former professional boxer who competed from 2001 to 2017. He held the WBO super-middleweight title twice between 2009 and 2014, and the European light-heavyweight title from 2016 to 2017. Stieglitz also challenged twice for world titles in 2007 and 2015.

Early life 
Stieglitz is part of the German diaspora that exists in Russia, and his original surname of Shtikhlits is a Russified version of the German surname Stieglitz, which he now uses. He himself has said that, even when living in Russia, he always felt foreign and he felt German. Stieglitz went to live in Germany as soon as he got the chance.

Amateur career 
Stieglitz had an amateur record of 80 wins and 10 losses.

Professional career
After accumulating a record of 31-1, Stieglitz then suffered his second loss to Mexico's Librado Andrade in eight rounds at the Morongo Casino Resort & Spa, Cabazon, California in an IBF super-middleweight title eliminator. Stieglitz won the vacant WBC International super-middleweight title on December 9, 2008 in Sölden (Austria) to previously unbeaten Lukas Wilaschek.

WBO super-middleweight champion
Stieglitz vacated the WBC International on 22 June 2009 to fight Karoly Balzsay for the WBO super-middleweight title. At the end of round ten, as a groggy and beaten Balzsay barely wobbled back to his corner, Balzsay's trainer Fritz Sdinek called for help and Balzsay was quickly taken from the ring to the hospital on a stretcher with his neck in a neck brace. Stieglitz recorded a fifth-round technical knockout of Ruben Eduardo Acosta to retain his WBO super-middleweight title. The fight was stopped at 1:48 to give Stieglitz the victory in his first defense. On April 17, 2010 he successfully defended his title in Magdeburg against Eduard Gutknecht.

Stieglitz retained his title with a hard-fought unanimous decision over his Mexican challenger Enrique Ornelas, Andrade's younger brother, at the Freiberger Arena in Dresden. It was a slow start of both fights and little less action but Stieglitz started this fight in style in the second round. The German champion progressed the fight with his sharp jab to give Ornelas some trouble but the Mexican also landed some precise and dangerous shots towards Stieglitz.

He then made successful defenses against Khoren Gevor and Henry Weber. Stieglitz was supposed to face former three-time titleholder Mikkel Kessler in his hometown of Copenhagen, Denmark to defend his 168-pound belt on April 14, 2012 but Kessler pulled out due to injury. Instead, he defended the title with a unanimous decision win over Nader Hamdan on May 5, 2012.

Stieglitz vs. Arthur Abraham trilogy
Stieglitz then lost the WBO super-middleweight title to Arthur Abraham on August 25, 2012. He would rebound with a win over Michal Nieroda on January 26, 2013 before avenging his loss to Abraham and regaining the WBO super-middleweight title with a fourth-round knockout on March 23, 2013.

His first defense in his second reign as WBO super-middleweight champion was a tenth-round TKO win over Yuzo Kiyota on July 13, 2013. The result was originally announced as a Technical Decision win for Stieglitz, but was changed to a TKO after the Bund Deutscher Berufsboxer examined the ending of the fight and concluded that Stieglitz did not accidentally headbutt Kiyota. The change was approved by the WBO.

His second defense in his second reign as WBO Champion was against Isaac Ekpo on October 19, 2013. Stieglitz won via unanimous decision.

A rubber match with Arthur Abraham took place on March 1, 2014, with the WBO super-middleweight title on the line once again. Stieglitz lost the bout via split decision.

Retirement
On 23 May 2017 he announced his retirement from professional boxing with a record of 50 wins, 5 losses and 2 draws. The retirement was injury-related, due to the various operations on his left hand and a shoulder injury which had not fully healed.

Professional boxing record

References

External links

1981 births
Living people
People from Yeysk
World super-middleweight boxing champions
World Boxing Organization champions
German male boxers
Super-middleweight boxers
Light-heavyweight boxers
European Boxing Union champions